Jeremy Scott Teela (born 27 October 1976) is a former American biathlete and a Staff Sergeant in the United States Army.

Life and career
Teela is a three-time Olympian, having competed in the 2002, 2006, and 2010 Winter Olympics.

Teela retired from the sport at the end of the 2013–14 season.

At the 2002 Winter Olympics in Salt Lake City, at the biathlon course in Soldier Hollow, he finished 14th. He participated in the men's 4 × 7.5 km relay team at the 2006 Winter Olympics in Turin, which finishing 9th.

At the 2010 Winter Olympics in Vancouver, Teela finished 9th in the 10 km sprint, the best individual American result to date in biathlon; 13th as part of the 4 × 7.5 km relay team ; and 24th in the 12.5 km pursuit.

Teela's best World Cup result was a 3rd place in an individual distance race at Whistler Mountain on March 11, 2009. He did not compete in the World Cup racing during the 2011–12 season and 2012–13 season.

Biathlon results
All results are sourced from the International Biathlon Union.

Olympic Games

*Mass start was added as an event in 2006.

World Championships

*During Olympic seasons competitions are only held for those events not included in the Olympic program.
**Team was removed as an event in 1998, and mass start was added in 1999 with the mixed relay being added in 2005.

References

External links

 
 

1976 births
Living people
American male biathletes
Biathletes at the 2002 Winter Olympics
Biathletes at the 2006 Winter Olympics
Biathletes at the 2010 Winter Olympics
Olympic biathletes of the United States
People from Tonasket, Washington
 United States Army soldiers
U.S. Army World Class Athlete Program